Jane Gibson Albright (born May 26, 1955) is an American women's college basketball coach who was most recently head coach at Nevada from 2008 to 2017. Albright was previously head coach at Northern Illinois from 1984 to 1994, Wisconsin from 1994 to 2003, and Wichita State from 2003 to 2008.

Early life and education
Born and raised in Graham, North Carolina, Albright graduated from Graham High School in 1973 and Appalachian State University in 1977 cum laude with a bachelor's degree in health and physical education. At Appalachian State, Albright played basketball and volleyball.

Coaching career
Albright began her career as the girls' varsity basketball coach at Spartanburg High School in Spartanburg, South Carolina in 1977. The team went 3–18 in Albright's first year, then improved to 11–10 in 1978–79, 16–13 in 1979–80, and 20–7 in 1980–81 and made the playoffs in 1980 and 1981.

From 1981 to 1983, Albright was a graduate assistant at Tennessee under Pat Summitt. Albright then was an assistant coach at Cincinnati for the 1983–84 season.

From 1984-1994, Albright was the head coach at Northern Illinois University and helped the Lady Huskies to become a nationally recognized program.  She had a record of 188-110 in her 11 years at NIU as the Lady Huskies made the NCAA tournament four times in five years.

From 1994 to 2003, she coached at the Wisconsin where she compiled a 161–107 record with five NCAA tournament and two WNIT appearances. The two WNIT appearances were back to back, in 1999 as runners-up and 2000 as champions. For the first time in program history, Wisconsin reached the top 10 in both the AP and coaches' polls during the 2001–02 season. Following a 7–21 season in 2002–03, Albright resigned on February 25, 2003 with one year remaining on her contract and Wisconsin declining to sign her to a long-term contract extension.

After nine seasons at Wisconsin, Albright was head coach at Wichita State from 2003 to 2008, where she went 48–95. Her best season was in 2005–06 with a 15–13 record, the only winning season during her five seasons there.

Albright was head coach at Nevada from 2008 to 2017, with a 115–165 overall record with two WNIT appearances in 2010 and 2011. Nevada had its first 20-win season in 2010–11 with a 22–11 record that included regular season wins over Power Five opponents NC State and Arizona and the program's first WNIT victory, over Saint Mary's. However, Nevada went only 7–23 in 2011–12, its final season in the Western Athletic Conference.

In 2012, Nevada moved to the Mountain West Conference (MW). Nevada had only one winning season after that, the 2013–14 season with an 18–13 (12–6 MW) record. On March 1, 2017, Albright retired from Nevada, following an 11–19 season.

USA Basketball
Albright served as the assistant coach for the team representing the United States at the World University Games held in Buffalo, New York in July 1993. The USA team defeated teams from Israel, Taiwan, the Ukraine, and Russia. They were defeated by Cuba 88–80 and by China 75–73. The USA team defeated Lithuania 83–73 to earn the bronze medal.

In 1996, Albright was head coach of a U.S. squad of players chosen after the Olympic team that won the gold medal in the William Jones Cup.

Head coaching record

References

1955 births
Living people
American women's basketball coaches
American women's basketball players
Appalachian State Mountaineers women's basketball players
Appalachian State Mountaineers women's volleyball players
Basketball coaches from North Carolina
Basketball players from North Carolina
Cincinnati Bearcats women's basketball coaches
Forwards (basketball)
High school basketball coaches in South Carolina
Nevada Wolf Pack women's basketball coaches
Northern Illinois Huskies women's basketball coaches
People from Graham, North Carolina
Tennessee Lady Volunteers basketball coaches
University of Tennessee faculty
Wichita State Shockers women's basketball coaches
Wisconsin Badgers women's basketball coaches